Pachl (Czech feminine: Pachlová) is a surname. Notable people with the surname include:

 Carole Jane Pachl (born 1938), Canadian figure skater
 Franz Pachl (born 1951), German chess grandmaster
 Petra Pachlová (born 1986), Czech ice dancer

German-language surnames